City College is a composite fully state government-aided public college, affiliated to the University of Calcutta. Established in 1881, it is one of the heritage institutions of Kolkata, and played a prominent role in the wake of the Bengal Renaissance of the nineteenth century. The college is located at 102/1, Raja Rammohan Roy Sarani (Amherst Street), Kolkata-700009. It shares premises with Rammohan College (morning college) and Anandamohan College (evening college).
In the year 1961 the branches of City College emerged as separate colleges under instructions of the University Grants Commission. While the original college retained the original name “City College”, the branches were named as 1. Rammohan College, 2. Ananda Mohan College, 3. Umesh Chandra College, 4. City College of Commerce and Business Administration, 5. Sivanath Sastri College, 6. Heramba Chandra College, and 7. Prafulla Chandra College. Together they are referred to as City group of College (Kolkata).

Notable alumni
 Swami Shuddhananda, former president of the Ramakrishna Mission
 Soumitra Chatterjee, actor
 Laxminath Bezbarua, Assamese writer and poet
 Budhindranath Delihial Bhattacharya, lexicographer, author, dramatist and tea planter
 Barun Sengupta, founder and editor of Bartaman newspaper
 Shakti Chattopadhyay, poet
 Haradhan Bandopadhyay, actor
 Subhankar Chattopadhyay, Indian Filmmaker, Scriptwriter, Creator of Non Fiction shows. 
 Mohit Chattopadhyay, playwright, screenwriter
 Muhammad Shahidullah, linguist
 Rajanikanta Sen, poet, composer
 Samir Roychoudhury, poet, writer
 Satyendra Chandra Mitra, freedom fighter, politician
 Sunil Kanti Roy, managing director of Peerless Group and Padma Shri awardee
 Birendra Nath Mallick, neurobiologist, Shanti Swarup Bhatnagar laureate
 Bankim Ghosh, Bengali actor and theatre personality
 Jibanananda Das, Bengali poet and writer
 Bhaskar Saha, immunologist, Shanti Swarup Bhatnagar laureate
 Pran Ranjan Sengupta, mathematician and scientist
 Akhil Niyogi, Bengali writer and editor

See also 
List of colleges affiliated to the University of Calcutta
Education in India
Education in West Bengal

References

External links
 Official website

Universities and colleges in Kolkata
Academic institutions associated with the Bengal Renaissance
University of Calcutta affiliates
Universities and colleges affiliated with the Brahmo Samaj
Educational institutions established in 1881
1881 establishments in British India